Kypseli is a small mountainous village in Kastoria Regional Unit, Macedonia, Greece. According to the 2011 Greek census, the village had 86 inhabitants.

Demographics & Names 
According to the statistics of the Bulgarian geographer Vasil Kanchov, the village had 680 Orthodox Greek inhabitants in 1900. In 1926, the village was renamed from Pseltskon to Kypseli. The majority of the inhabitants of the village moved to Kastoria and Maniakoi in 1970s.

References

External links 
Photo showing the village
Photo from fonikastorias.gr

Populated places in Kastoria (regional unit)